Maritime Electric is the supplier of electricity in Prince Edward Island, Canada. Maritime Electric is a public utility, and is regulated by the Island Regulatory and Appeals Commission (IRAC) under the Electric Power Act and the Renewable Energy Act. The utility operates two generating stations on the island: the Charlottetown Thermal Generating Station and the Borden Generating Station.

On November 13, 2009, it was announced that the PEI government was in discussion with the province of Quebec, with regard to providing electric power between the two provinces, which could lead to a long-term supply contract with Hydro-Québec, the construction of a submarine transmission line linking PEI and the Magdalen Islands, and, pending Fortis' involvement, the sale of Maritime Electric to Hydro-Québec. This followed the announcement of Hydro-Québec's proposed purchase of most of NB Power's assets two weeks earlier (which failed in March 2010).

See also

 List of Canadian electric utilities

References

External links
 

Electric power companies of Canada
Fortis Inc.
Companies based in Charlottetown
Canadian companies established in 1918
Energy companies established in 1918
1918 establishments in Prince Edward Island